Louis Antonio (born January 23, 1934) is an American actor and TV director best known for performing in the films Cool Hand Luke and America America. He also starred in two short-lived TV series, Dog and Cat, and Makin' It.

Early years
Born in Oklahoma City of Greek descent (the family name was originally Antoniou), he made a name for himself as a sports reporter on the Daily Oklahoman.

Career
In January 1962, Antonio was a guest artist at Elmwood Playhouse in Nyack, New York, where he directed Enid Bagnold's The Chalk Garden. In the mid-1960s, Antonio began his career as a television actor, sometimes starring in multiple episodes of the same series, as different characters. These series included The Rookies, The Naked City, Mission: Impossible, Night Gallery, Gunsmoke, The Fugitive, Twelve O'Clock High, The Monkees, The F.B.I., The Defenders, The Mod Squad, Dan August, Cannon, Hawaii Five-O, Bracken's World, The Hardy Boys/Nancy Drew Mysteries,  and I Dream of Jeannie. Antonio memorably guest-starred as the human version of a chimpanzee-turned-human on a popular fifth-season episode of Bewitched titled "Going Ape", which also guest-starred Danny Bonaduce. He also starred as Barney in The Snoop Sisters.

On Star Trek, he co-starred with Frank Gorshin in “Let That Be Your Last Battlefield” (1969),  which eventually became one of the most popular of the series. In 2016, The Hollywood Reporter rated “Let That Be Your Last Battlefield” the 11th best television episode of all Star Trek franchise television shows prior to Star Trek: Discovery including live-action and animated series but not counting the movies. Also in 2016, SyFy ranked guest stars Frank Gorshin and Lou Antonio (as Bele and Lokai, the black and white aliens), the 10th best guest stars on the original series.

As a director, Antonio mostly worked in television, notably including: The Flying Nun, The Young Rebels, Banacek, The Partridge Family, The Rockford Files, Owen Marshall: Counselor at Law, Picket Fences, American Gothic, Party of Five, Dawson's Creek, Chicago Hope, CSI: Crime Scene Investigation, and The West Wing. His last work was on Boston Legal in 2007.

Personal life
Antonio was married to fellow Actors Studio member, Lane Bradbury and they had two daughters. The couple divorced in 1980. Their daughter Elkin Antoniou is a writer, director and award-winning documentarian.

Antonio's elder brother, Jim Antonio, and sister-in-law, Hildy Brooks, are also actors.

Filmography
 1969 Have Gun-Will Travel (TV Series) as Ted Greive
 1961 Splendor in the Grass as Oil Field Worker At Party (uncredited)
 1961 Macbeth (TV Movie)
 1961-1963 Naked City (TV Series) as Charlie Tepperoni / Ernie / Al Machias / Civil Service Applicant
 1963 Breaking Point (TV Series) as Paul Knopf
 1963 Route 66 (TV Series) as Tony Donato
 1962-1963 The Defenders (TV Series) as Danny Norton / Bo Jackson / Sam
 1963 America, America as Osman
 1965 For the People
 1964-1965 Twelve O'Clock High (TV Series) as Captain Bing Pollard / Captain Wade Ritchie
 1966 The Virginian (TV Series) as Niles Tait
 1966 The Wackiest Ship in the Army (TV Series) as Jocko
 1966 Hawaii as Reverend Abraham Hewlett
 1966 Hawk (TV Series) as Frankie Gellen
 1963-1966 The Fugitive (TV Series) as Don / Matt Mooney / Vinnie
 1967 The Road West (TV Series) as Mike Kerkorian
 1967 The Monkees (TV Series) as Judd
 1967 Cool Hand Luke as "Koko"
 1968 I Dream of Jeannie (TV Series) as Charley
 1968 The Danny Thomas Hour (TV Series) as Stefanos
 1968 Bonanza (TV Series) as Davey
 1968-1980 Insight (TV Series) as Burglar / J.P.
 1969 Star Trek (TV Series) as Lokai
 1969 Gentle Ben (TV Series) as Kee Cho
 1965-1969 Gunsmoke (TV Series) as Mace / Smiley / Curt Tynan / Rich / Harve Kane
 1969 Bewitched (TV Series) as Harry Simmons
 1970 Sole Survivor (TV Movie) as Tony
 1969-1970 Here Come the Brides (TV Series) as Telly Theodakis
 1970 The Flying Nun (TV Series) as The Stone Mason (uncredited)
 1970 The Phynx as Corrigan
 1970-1971 The Mod Squad (TV Series) as Arnold Kane / Case
 1970 Bracken's World (TV Series) as Hal Ingersol
 1970 Storefront Lawyers (TV Series) as Walter Babson
 1971 Dan August (TV Series) as Gordon Krager
 1971 Hawaii Five-O (TV Series) as David Harper
 1971 Cannon (TV Series) as Arnie Crawford
 1970-1972 Mission: Impossible (TV Series) as Rudy Blake / Robert Siomney
 1972 Cade's County (TV Series) as Frank Cameron
 1973 Night Gallery (TV Series) as Jake
 1973 Partners in Crime (TV Movie) as Sam Hatch
 1971-1973 The F.B.I. (TV Series) as Parrish / Arlen Parent
 1973-1974 The Snoop Sisters (TV Series) as Barney
 1973-1974 The Rookies (TV Series) as Jack Lembo / Jay Warfield
 1977 Dog and Cat (TV Series) as Sergeant Jack Ramsey
 1977 The Hardy Boys/Nancy Drew Mysteries (TV Series) as The Director
 1979 Makin' It (TV Series) as Joseph Manucci
 1980 Where The Ladies Go (TV Movie) as Hugo
 1985 Thirteen at Dinner (TV Movie) as Movie Producer (uncredited)
 1990 Face to Face (Hallmark Hall of Fame presentation, TV Movie) as Dr. Calvin Finch
 2003 Frankie and Johnny Are Married as Lou Antonio

As director

Heroic Mission (1967)
Then Came Bronson (1969)
The Flying Nun (1969–70)
The Young Rebels (1970)
Getting Together (1971)
The Partridge Family (1971–1972)
Owen Marshall, Counselor at Law (1971-1973)
Banacek (1972)
The Rookies (1973)
Griff (1973; also writer)
Love Is Not Forever (1974)
Fools, Females and Fun (1974)
Amy Prentiss (1974)
Someone I Touched (1975)
McCloud (1972–1975)
McMillan & Wife (1975–1976)
The Rockford Files (1974–1976)
Lanigan's Rabbi (1976)
Delvecchio (1976)
Rich Man, Poor Man Book II (1976)
Something for Joey (1977)
The Girl in the Empty Grave (1977)
The Gypsy Warriors (1978)
The Critical List (1978)
A Real American Hero (1978)
The Chinese Typewriter (1979)
Silent Victory: The Kitty O'Neil Story (1979)
Heaven on Earth (1979)
Breaking Up Is Hard to Do (1979)
The Contender (1980)
We're Fighting Back (1981)
The Star Maker (1981)
The Steeler and the Pittsburgh Kid (1981)
Something So Right (1982)
Between Friends (1983)
A Good Sport (1984)
Threesome (1984)
Rearview Mirror (1984)
Thirteen at Dinner (1985)
One Terrific Guy (1986)
Shell Game (1987)
Pals (1987)

Mayflower Madam (1987)
The Outside Woman (1989; also producer)
Dark Holiday (1989; also executive producer)
Face to Face (Hallmark Hall of Fame presentation; 1990)
Sporting Chance (1990)
This Gun for Hire (1991)
Lies Before Kisses (1991)
The Last Prostitute (1991)
The Rape of Doctor Willis (1991)
A Taste for Killing (1992)
Nightmare in the Daylight (1992)
The Contender (1993)
Party of Five (1994)
Diagnosis: Murder (1994)
Chicago Hope (1995)
The Cosby Mysteries (1995)
American Gothic (1995)
Picket Fences (1993–1996)
Dark Skies (1996)
Mr & Mrs. Smith (1996)
Spy Game (1997)
Roar (1997)
Dawson's Creek (1998)
Vengeance Unlimited (1998)
To Have & To Hold
Wasteland (1999)
The Force (1999)
Get Real (1999)
Felicity (2000)
The West Wing (2001)
CSI: Crime Scene Investigation (2000–2001)
UC: Undercover (2001)
The Guardian (2001)
First Monday (2002)
The Handler (2003)
Numb3rs (2003)
Reunion (2005)
Boston Legal (2006–2007)

References

External links

Lou Antonio at the University of Wisconsin's Actors Studio audio collection

American people of Greek descent
American male film actors
American male television actors
American television directors
1934 births
Living people
20th-century American male actors
Male actors from Oklahoma City